Aldridge Gardens is a 30-acre (121,000 m2) garden, prominently featuring hydrangeas, located on the former Aldridge Estate in Hoover, Alabama, United States.

Local nurseryman Eddie Aldridge purchased the property from the Coxe family in 1977 as a residence.  Aldridge, who along with his father, Loren L. Aldridge, found and patented Hydrangea quercifolia 'Snowflake', a double-flowering form of Oakleaf Hydrangea. In 1997 the gardens were conveyed to the City of Hoover and formally dedicated to the public. The site is now managed by a non-profit organization. A new master plan was approved in 1997 to guide the future development of the gardens.

The gardens contain extensive hydrangea plantings, as well as a five acre (20,234 m2) lake with walking trails. Public lectures and educational activities are scheduled throughout the year.

See also
 List of botanical gardens and arboretums in Alabama

References

External links 

Aldridge Gardens

Botanical gardens in Alabama
Hoover, Alabama
Protected areas of Jefferson County, Alabama